is a former Japanese football player.

Club statistics

References

External links

1988 births
Living people
Kwansei Gakuin University alumni
Association football people from Osaka Prefecture
Japanese footballers
J1 League players
J2 League players
Cerezo Osaka players
Association football midfielders